KJCB (770 AM, The Voice of the South) was a radio station broadcasting an Urban Contemporary music format from 1981 to 2011. Licensed to Lafayette, Louisiana, United States, the station was owned by R & M Broadcasting.

History
The station was assigned the call letters KJCB on December 14, 1981. On April 4, 2011, KJCB was forced off the air after it lost its transmitter lease. The station's license was cancelled on January 23, 2020, after its licensee failed to respond to an inquiry from the FCC as to whether the station was operating.

References

External link
FCC Station Search Details: DKJCB (Facility ID: 54341)

Radio stations established in 1984
Radio stations disestablished in 2020
Defunct radio stations in the United States
JCB
1984 establishments in Louisiana
2020 disestablishments in Louisiana
Defunct mass media in Louisiana